The Battle of Ladeira da Velha was fought on August 3, 1831, between Portuguese Liberal and  Miguelite forces on São Miguel Island in the Azores, as part of the Portuguese civil war. It ended in a Liberal victory, which put the island and the rest of the Archipelago under Liberal control.

The Battle 
Since the Battle of Praia da Vitória in 1829, Terceira Island in the Azores was under control of the Liberal forces.  The Miguelites still maintained control over São Miguel Island and the Portuguese mainland. 
On August 1, a liberal force under command of the Count of Vila Flor embarked on the northern coast of São Miguel, near the parish of Achadinha. 

Two days later a battle was fought at Ladeira da Velha near Porto Formoso, between the invading Liberal army and troops loyal to King Miguel. The battle ended in a victory for the Liberals, which enabled them to firmly establish their control over the entire Azores Archipelago. They used the islands as a base to invade the Portuguese Mainland the next year, with the Landing at Mindelo on 8 July 1832.

Sources
Acção da Ladeira da Velha
A Batalha da Ladeira da Velha (S.Miguel - Azores).

Ladeira da Velha
1831 in Portugal
Ladeira da Velha
Ladeira da Velha
August 1831 events
Ladeira da Velha